Øivind Jensen (17 January 1905 – 9 January 1989) was a Norwegian boxer who competed in the 1924 Summer Olympics. In 1924 he was eliminated in the second round of the middleweight class after losing his fight to Harry Henning.

References

External links
Part 5 the boxing tournament

1905 births
1989 deaths
Middleweight boxers
Olympic boxers of Norway
Boxers at the 1924 Summer Olympics
Norwegian male boxers
20th-century Norwegian people